Mansour Al-Baloushi (born 4 April 1968) is an Omani sprinter. He competed in the men's 4 × 400 metres relay at the 1988 Summer Olympics.

References

External links
 

1968 births
Living people
Athletes (track and field) at the 1988 Summer Olympics
Omani male sprinters
Omani male middle-distance runners
Olympic athletes of Oman
Place of birth missing (living people)